The 2007-08 Buffalo Bulls Men's Basketball Team represented the University at Buffalo in the college basketball season of 2007–08.  The team was coached by Reggie Witherspoon.  The Bulls played their home games at Alumni Arena.

Roster

Schedule

|-
!colspan=9 style="background:#041A9B; color:white;"|  Exhibition

|-
!colspan=9 style="background:#041A9B; color:white;"| Regular season

|-
!colspan=9 style="background:#041A9B; color:white;"| MAC tournament

Buffalo Bulls
Buffalo Bulls men's basketball seasons
Buffalo Bulls
Buffalo Bulls